4'-Hydroxynorendoxifen is a synthetic, nonsteroidal antiestrogen of the triphenylethylene group. It is a dual selective estrogen receptor modulator (SERM) and aromatase inhibitor (AI), and was derived from tamoxifen, a SERM, and norendoxifen, a metabolite of tamoxifen that has been found to act as an AI. The drug has been suggested for potential development as a treatment for estrogen receptor (ER)-positive breast cancer. It was synthesized in 2015.

References 

Amines
Antiestrogens
Aromatase inhibitors
Phenols
Selective estrogen receptor modulators
Triphenylethylenes